Mojtaba Pirzadeh (Persian: مجتبی پیرزاده; born January 1, 1986) is an Iranian actor. He is best known for his role in the 2016 drama film The Salesman, which won the Academy Award for Best Foreign Language Film. He is also known for his performances in Rona, Azim's Mother (2018) and Tooman (2020). Pirzadeh earned a Crystal Simorgh nomination for his performance in Tooman.

Filmography

Film

Web

Television

Theatre

Awards and nominations

References

External links 

 

1986 births
Living people
People from Tehran
Iranian male film actors
Iranian male stage actors
Iranian male television actors
All articles with unsourced statements